Nenad Dedić (born 2 February 1990) is a Croatian footballer who plays for SV Neresheim.

Club career
Before joining Neresheim, he had a spell at fellow German side SV Ebnat as well as in Slovenia, Bosnia, the Czech Republic and Hungary.

References

External links
Nogomania profile 

1990 births
Living people
People from Sisak
Association football fullbacks
Croatian footballers
HNK Segesta players
NK Karlovac players
Szeged-Csanád Grosics Akadémia footballers
FC Baník Ostrava players
FK Željezničar Sarajevo players
NK Zavrč players
Croatian Football League players
Nemzeti Bajnokság I players
Czech First League players
Premier League of Bosnia and Herzegovina players
Slovenian PrvaLiga players
First Football League (Croatia) players
Landesliga players
Croatian expatriate footballers
Expatriate footballers in Hungary
Croatian expatriate sportspeople in Hungary
Expatriate footballers in the Czech Republic
Croatian expatriate sportspeople in the Czech Republic
Expatriate footballers in Bosnia and Herzegovina
Croatian expatriate sportspeople in Bosnia and Herzegovina
Expatriate footballers in Slovenia
Croatian expatriate sportspeople in Slovenia
Expatriate footballers in Germany
Croatian expatriate sportspeople in Germany